Einkommende Zeitungen was a German newspaper published from Leipzig, Germany by  Timotheus Ritzsch. It was the first daily newspaper in the world.

References

1650 establishments in the Holy Roman Empire
Publications established in 1650

German-language newspapers
Newspapers published in Germany